Klewnuggit Inlet Marine Provincial Park is a provincial park in British Columbia, Canada, located on the east side of Grenville Channel,  southeast of Prince Rupert, in the Range 4 Coast Land District.

Images

References

Provincial parks of British Columbia
North Coast Regional District
1993 establishments in British Columbia
Protected areas established in 1993
Marine parks of Canada
Range 4 Coast Land District